is a Japanese curler from Karuizawa, Nagano.

Career
Yamaguchi has competed at the World Men's Curling Championships six times in his career. At the 2009 Worlds in Moncton, New Brunswick, Canada, he played third for the Japanese team, which placed tenth in the tournament; At the 2013 Worlds in Victoria, British Columbia, Canada, he played third for the Japanese team, which placed 11th in the tournament; At the 2014 Worlds in Beijing, China, he played third for the Japanese team, which placed fifth in the tournament; At the 2015 Worlds in Halifax, Nova Scotia, Canada, he played as third for the Japanese team, which placed sixth in the tournament; At the 2016 Worlds in Basel, Switzerland, he played second for the Japanese team, which placed fourth in the tournament; and at the 2017 Worlds in Edmonton, Alberta, Canada, he played second for the Japanese team, which placed seventh in the tournament.  He played second for Yusuke Morozumi rink and represented Japan at the 2018 Winter Olympics, finishing in 8th place.

Mixed doubles
Yamaguchi represented Japan with Satsuki Fujisawa at the 2018 World Mixed Doubles Curling Championship, finishing in 5th place. The pair again represented Japan at the 2019 World Mixed Doubles Curling Championship, finishing in 5th once again.

Personal life
Yamaguchi is employed as a sports instructor.

References

External links

1984 births
Living people
Japanese male curlers
Sportspeople from Nagano Prefecture
Asian Games medalists in curling
Curlers at the 2017 Asian Winter Games
Medalists at the 2017 Asian Winter Games
Asian Games silver medalists for Japan
Sportspeople from Hokkaido
Curlers at the 2018 Winter Olympics
Olympic curlers of Japan
Pacific-Asian curling champions
Aomori University alumni
Competitors at the 2007 Winter Universiade